Lalit Meena is a former MLA from Kishanganj-Shahbad constituency of Baran district.

Education
Post Graduate from Raj College Barra (Kota University) in 2008.

B.Ed. from Adarsh College of Education, University of Jammu in 2011.

References

Indian politicians
Bharatiya Janata Party politicians from Rajasthan
Living people
Year of birth missing (living people)